Ismael is a 2013 Spanish drama film directed by Marcelo Piñeyro.

Cast 
 Belén Rueda - Nora
 Mario Casas - Félix
 Sergi López - Jordi
 Ella Kweku - 
 Juan Diego Botto - Luis
 Larsson do Amaral - Ismael
 Mikel Iglesias - Chino

References

External links 

Spanish drama films
2013 drama films
2013 films
2010s Spanish films